Pandatharippu or Pandaththarippu or Pandaththeruppu is a village in the northern Jaffna District of Sri Lanka.  It is located approximately 20 km from City of Jaffna. It is also spelled "Pandathirippu". It was a mission location when the American Ceylon Mission (ACM) came to Sri Lanka in the 19th century. Dr. John Scudder founded the Asia’s first western medical center in this village. It was also known as Panditeripo  in ACM documents. There are number of schools some which were founded by ACM and Churches and Hindu Temples in the village.

References

Villages in Jaffna District
Valikamam South West DS Division